Events from the year 1393 in Ireland.

Incumbent
Lord: Richard II

Events
 Richard Northalis, Bishop of Ossory appointed Lord Chancellor of Ireland

Births

Deaths
 James Butler, 4th Earl of Ormond

References